Elizabeth Fama is a young adult author, best known for her book Monstrous Beauty (Farrar, Straus and Giroux Books for Young Readers, 2012), a fantasy novel for teens. Her third book is Plus One, which published in April 2014.

Background
Elizabeth attended University of Chicago Laboratory Schools. She has a BA (1985) in biology with honors from the University of Chicago, and an MBA (1991) and PhD (1996) in economics and finance from the University of Chicago Graduate School of Business.

Elizabeth is the daughter of Eugene Fama. She is married to John H. Cochrane and together, they have four children.

Works
Overboard, Cricket Books, Chicago (2002) 
Men Who Wish To Drown (e-book), Tor.com, New York (2012)  
Monstrous Beauty, Farrar Straus Giroux, New York (2012)  
Noma Girl, Tor·Com, New York (2014)  
Plus One, Farrar Straus Giroux, New York (2014)

Reception
Fama's works have generally been well received. Kirkus Reviews wrote about Overboard, "Although some scenes seem implausible, particularly Emily’s ability to carry on complete conversations and sing in her weakened state, first-time author Fama skillfully conveys the impact of survival in human nature" and "Inspired by an actual ferry accident caused by lax safety standards, this is a powerful exploration on the will to live", while Publishers Weekly asserted "Such muddled, cumbersome prose weighs down the chronicle of Emily's nightlong struggle to survive in the sea, heavily reliant upon coincidences."

Kirkus was also positive about Monstrous Beauty writing "Not so much romance as suspense, this stylish fantasy mesmerizes", and while Publishers Weekly called it "a chilling and original story", they also found "The alternating narrative device can make for stutters in the momentum, and there are stretches (notably when genealogy is rehearsed) where the plot trudges." but "The horror and humanity are adroitly handled, however, and Fama never lapses into cliché."

For Plus One, Publishers Weekly noted "Fama smoothly unspools the details of her alternate Earth’s history in conversational flashbacks that never impede the brisk pacing, yet enhance the sense of connection with her very human characters."

Awards
The American Library Association included Monstrous Beauty on its 2013 list of Best Fiction for Young Adults, and it won a silver Odyssey Award for best audiobook produced for children and/or young adults. It was also a 2012 Nerdies Book Award nominee. Fama's first novel, Overboard (Cricket Books, 2002), was for ages 11 and up, and set in Indonesia. It was named a 2003 Best Book for Young Adults by the American Library Association (one of only eleven books selected unanimously by the committee that year), it received the 2002–2003 honor award for children's fiction from the Society of Midland Authors, and it was nominated for five state readers' choice awards (New Hampshire, Texas, Illinois, Utah, and Florida).

References

External links

Author Elizabeth Fama official website
Elizabeth Fama at Blogger.com

Living people
American children's writers
University of Chicago alumni 
University of Chicago Booth School of Business alumni
University of Chicago Laboratory Schools alumni
1965 births